Arvid Ohrling (February 1, 1887 – April 11, 1972) was a Swedish track and field athlete who competed in the 1912 Summer Olympics. He was born in Gävle and died in Solna Municipality. In 1912 he finished tenth in the two handed javelin throw event and 16th in the javelin throw competition.

References

External links
Sports Reference
profile 

1887 births
1972 deaths
People from Gävle
Swedish male javelin throwers
Olympic athletes of Sweden
Athletes (track and field) at the 1912 Summer Olympics
Sportspeople from Gävleborg County